Ian Barnes (born 19 April 1948) is a former Scotland international rugby union player.

Rugby Union career

Amateur career

Barnes first played for Hawick Linden.

He played for Hawick from 1968 onwards.

He also played for Edinburgh Academicals, Heriots, Stewart's Melville, Haddington, North Berwick and Trinity Academicals.

Provincial career

He played for South of Scotland District.

He played for Scotland Probables in 1975.

International career

He was capped by Scotland 'B' against France 'B' in 1971.

He went on to receive 7 full senior caps from Scotland.

Coaching career

He was Head Coach of Hawick.

He was Head Coach of Edinburgh Academicals.

He was Head Coach of Edinburgh University.

Administrative career

For a short spell he was a Director at Hawick.

He was elected to the Scottish Rugby Council in 2008.

Journalistic career

He contributes articles to the internet rugby magazine site The Offside Line.

Business career

He was a Charter Accountant.

References

1948 births
Living people
Scottish rugby union players
Scotland international rugby union players
Rugby union players from Hawick
Hawick RFC players
Scotland 'B' international rugby union players
South of Scotland District (rugby union) players
Scotland Probables players
Hawick Linden RFC players
North Berwick RFC players
Stewart's Melville RFC players
Haddington RFC players
Edinburgh Academicals rugby union players
Trinity Academicals RFC players
Rugby union locks